Ensete ventricosum, commonly known as enset or ensete, Ethiopian banana, Abyssinian banana, pseudo-banana,  false banana and wild banana, is an herbaceous species of flowering plant in the banana family Musaceae. The domesticated form of the plant is cultivated only in Ethiopia, where it provides the staple food for approximately 20 million people. The name Ensete ventricosum was first published in the Kew Bulletin 1947, p. 101. Its synonyms include Musa arnoldiana De Wild., Musa ventricosa Welw. and Musa ensete J. F. Gmelin. In its wild form, it is native to the eastern edge of the Great African Plateau, extending northwards from South Africa through Mozambique, Zimbabwe, Malawi, Kenya, Uganda and Tanzania to Ethiopia, and west to the Congo, being found in high-rainfall forests on mountains, and along forested ravines and streams.

Description 
The flowers, which only occur once from the centre of the plant at the end of that plant's life, are in massive pendant thyrses covered by large pink bracts. The roots are an important foodstuff, but the fruits are inedible (insipid, flavorless) and have hard, black, rounded seeds. After flowering, the plant dies.

The Latin specific epithet ventricosum means “with a swelling on the side, like a belly”.

Use as a foodcrop 

Enset is a very important local food source especially in Ethiopia. The Food and Agriculture Organization reports that "enset provides more amount of foodstuff per unit area than most cereals. It is estimated that 40 to 60 enset plants occupying  can provide enough food for a family of 5 to 6 people."

Enset (E. ventricosum) is Ethiopia's most important root crop, a traditional staple in the densely populated south and southwestern parts of Ethiopia. Its importance to the diet and economy of the Gurage and Sidama peoples was first recorded by Jerónimo Lobo in the seventeenth century. Because of the long period of time from planting to harvest, plantings need to be staggered over time, to ensure that there is enset available for harvest in every season. Enset will tolerate drought better than most cereal crops.

Wild enset plants are produced from seeds, while most domesticated plants are propagated from suckers. Up to 400 suckers can be produced from just one mother plant. In 1994  of enset were grown in Ethiopia, with a harvest estimated to be almost . Enset is often intercropped with sorghum, although the practice amongst the Gedeo people is to intercrop it with coffee. 

The young and tender tissues in the centre or heart of the plant (the growing point) are cooked and eaten, being tasty and nutritious and very like the core of palms and cycads. Fermenting these pulverised parts results in a food called kocho. Bulla is made from the liquid squeezed out of the mixture and sometimes eaten as a porridge, while the remaining solids are suitable for consumption after a settling period of some days. Mixed kocho and bulla can be kneaded into dough, then flattened and baked over a fire. Kocho is in places regarded as a delicacy, suitable for serving at feasts and ceremonies such as weddings, when wheat flour is added. The fresh corm is cooked like potatoes before eating.

It is a major crop, although often supplemented with cereal crops. However its value as a famine food has fallen for a number of reasons, as detailed in the April 2003 issue of the UN-OCHA Ethiopia unit's Focus on Ethiopia:
Apart from an enset plant disease epidemic in 1984–85 which wiped out large parts of the plantations and created the green famine, in the past 10 years major factors were recurrent drought and food shortage together with acute land shortage that forced farmers more and more into consumption of immature plants. Hence farmers were overexploiting their Enset reserves thereby causing gradual losses and disappearance of the false banana as an important household food security reserve. Even though not all the plant losses can be attributed to drought and land shortage and hence early consumption of immature crops, estimations go as far as more than 60% of the false banana crop stands have been lost in some areas in SNNPR during the last 10 years. This basically means that a great many people who used to close the food gap with false banana consumption are not able to do so any more, and lacking a viable alternative, have become food insecure and highly vulnerable to climatic and economic disruptions of their agricultural system.

Other uses 
The plant is quick-growing and often cultivated as an ornamental plant. In frost-prone areas it requires winter protection under glass. It has gained the Royal Horticultural Society's Award of Garden Merit, as has the cultivar 'Maurelii' (Ethiopian black banana) 

A good quality fibre, suitable for ropes, twine, baskets, and general weaving, is obtained from the leaves. Dried leaf-sheaths are used as packing material, serving the same function as Western foam plastic and polystyrene. The entire plant but the roots is used to feed livestock. Fresh leaves are a common fodder for cattle during the dry season, and many farmers feed their animals with residues of enset harvest or processing.

History 
In 1769, the celebrated Scottish traveller James Bruce first sent a description and quite accurate drawings of a plant common in the marshes around Gondar in Ethiopia, confidently pronounced it to be "no species of Musa" and wrote that its local name was "ensete". In 1853 the British Consul at Mussowah sent some seeds to Kew Gardens, mentioning that their native name was ansett. Kew, quite understandably, did not make the connection, especially as they had never before seen such seeds. However, when the seeds had germinated and the plants had rapidly gained size, their relationship to the true banana became obvious.

Bruce also discussed the plant's place in the mythology of Egypt and pointed out that some Egyptian statue carvings depict the goddess Isis sitting among the leaves of what was thought to be a banana plant, a plant native to Southeast Asia and not known in Ancient Egypt.

Pests and diseases 
A major issue with the cultivation of enset is its vulnerability to several pests and diseases.

Pests 
The most common pest that threatens enset is caused by the Cataenococcus enset which is a root mealybug. The Cataenococcus enset feeds on the roots and corm of the enset plant which leads to slower growth and easier uprooting. Even though enset can be infested at all age stages, the highest risk is between the second or fourth growth year. The dispersion of the mealybug occurs through different vectors: First, the larvae can crawl short distances as adults mealybugs tend to move only after being disturbed. Second, mealybugs-ant symbiotic relationships can be linked to enset infestation and protect and even transport the mealybug over short distances. In return, they feed on the mealybug honeydew. Third, flooding events can transport the mealybug over longer distances and reach enset plants. However, the main transport vectors are unclean working tools and the usage of already infected suckers. This means that the best way to get rid of the bug and to limit its propagation is to uproot the plant and burn it. In addition, the fields can be kept free of plant growth for a month since the mealybug can only survive up to three weeks without plant material.

Other pests include nematodes, spider mites, aphids, mole rats, porcupines and wild pigs. The latter erode the corm and pseudostem. As for the nematodes, there are two predominant species: there are the root lesion nematodes (Pratylenchus goodeyi) and the root-knot nematodes (Meloidogyne sp.) and their appearance stand in connection with bacterial wilt. The nematode infestation leads to the easy uprooting of the affected plants. Crop rotation can counteract high nematode infestations.

Diseases 

The enset plant can be subject to multiple diseases that threaten its use in agriculture. The most well known of them is the infection by the bacteria Xanthomonas campestris pathovar Musacerum which creates bacterial wilt, also known as borijje and wol’a by the Kore people. The first observation of this disease was reported by Yirgou and Bradbury in 1968. The manifestation of the bacterial wilt is taking place in the apical leaves that will wilt then dry and finally lead to the drying of the whole plant. The only way to avoid the spreading of the disease is in uprooting, burning and burying plants as well as in applying strict control of the knives and tools used to harvest and treat the plants.

Other diseases have been observed such as Okka and Woqa which occur respectively in case of severe drought and in situations of too much water in the soil which causes the proliferation of bacteria. These problems can be solved by either watering the field when drought is present or by draining the soil to avoid too much water.

Another disease can strike enset even though it has been more observed on Banana plants (Musacea). This disease is caused by Mycospharella spp. and is commonly called black Sigatoka leaf streaks. The symptoms are basically dark/brown lesions surrounded by yellow on the leaves. This disease happens to be favoured by high rainfall and lower temperature.

Socio-cultural importance of enset in Ethiopia 
Enset cultivation in Ethiopia is reported to be 10,000 years old, though there is little empirical evidence to support this. It has major economic, social, cultural and environmental functions related to trade, medicine, cultural identity, rituals or settlement patterns.

The Enset-planting complex is one of the four farming systems of Ethiopia together with pastoralism, shifting cultivation and the seed-farming complex. It is widely used by around 20 million people, which represent 20-25% of the population. They mainly live in the densely populated highlands of south and southwest Ethiopia.

The plant is very important for food security because it is quite resistant to droughts (the growth only stops for a short time) and it can be harvested at any development stage. Nevertheless, in recent years, the population growth has put pressure on enset cultivation systems. This is mainly because of a decrease of fertilization through manure and an increase in demand, especially during droughts. At such times, enset becomes the only resource available.

The role of gender in enset cultivation 
Gender roles in enset cultivation are of high importance, as a strong division of work exists: generally men are responsible for the propagation, cultivation, and transplanting of enset, while women are in charge of manuring, hand-weeding, thinning and landrace selection. Additionally, women process enset plants, which is a tedious work (transformation of the plant into useful material, principally food and fibres) for which they generally come together. Men are banned from the field during this process. As women are responsible to provide sufficient food to their family, they are the ones who choose when and which plant to harvest and which quantity to sell.

Several studies state the importance of women's knowledge on the different crop varieties. Women are more likely to precisely recognize the different varieties of the plant than men. Nevertheless, women's work is often neglected or considered of lesser importance than men's by researchers and farmers and women are less likely to get access to extension services and quality services than men.

Another important aspect in which gender plays a role is in the classification of enset varieties. Indeed, they differentiate "male" varieties from "female" varieties, according to the preferences of men and women who harvest them. Whereas men prefer late maturing genotypes resistant to diseases, women prefer varieties that are good for cooking and can be harvested for consumption at an earlier stage. In general, households tend to have slightly more “female” genotypes than "male" ones.

Enset biodiversity and socio-cultural and -economic groups 
In Ethiopia, over 300 enset varieties have been recorded which is important for agro- and biodiversity. The farmers’ main interest for maintaining biodiversity is the different beneficial characteristics of each varietiy. This means that Ethiopian farmers spread important characteristics over many enset varieties instead of combining a number of desired characteristics in one single genotype This is a significant difference between Ethiopian subsistence farmers’ and plant breeders’ approaches.

More than 11 ethnic groups with different cultures, traditions and agricultural systems inhabit the enset-growing regions. This contributes to the high number of varieties. Over centuries, the different ethnic groups have applied their specific indigenous knowledge of farming systems in order to sustain production in various ways. A dying out of enset varieties would hence also make disappear a part of cultural practices and linguistic terms in Ethiopia (Negash et al., 2004).

Enset biodiversity is preserved not only due to the presence of different ethnic groups but also due to different households’ wealth status. Richer farmers can generally afford to maintain a higher level of farm biodiversity because they have more resources such as land, labour and livestock. Therefore, they can cultivate more varieties with differing specific characteristics. However, also poorer households try to maintain as many clones as possible by selecting the disease-resistant first.

Known variants and hybrids 
 Ensete ventricosum 'Atropurpureum'
 Ensete ventricosum 'Green Stripe'
 Red false banana (Ensete ventricosum 'Maurelii', syn. Musa maurelii)
 Ensete ventricosum 'Hiniba'
 Ensete ventricosum 'Montbeliardii'
 Ensete ventricosum 'Tandarra Red' (syn. Musa 'Tandarra Red')
 Ensete ventricosum 'Red Stripe' (syn. Musa 'Red Stripe')
 Ensete ventricosum 'Rubra' (syn. Musa ensete 'Rubra')

Sir John Kirk felt that in habit Ensete livingstonianum was indistinguishable from  E. ventricosum and noted that both are found in the mountains of equatorial Africa.

Gallery

References

External links 

 

ventricosum
Afromontane flora
Flora of East Tropical Africa
Flora of Northeast Tropical Africa
Flora of South Tropical Africa
Flora of West-Central Tropical Africa
Trees of Africa
Tropical fruit
Ethiopian cuisine
Garden plants of Africa
Plants described in 1859
Taxa named by Friedrich Welwitsch